Notions: Unlimited is a collection of science fiction short stories by Robert Sheckley. It was first published in 1960 by Bantam Books. It includes the following stories (magazines in which the stories originally appeared given in parentheses):

 "Gray Flannel Armor" (Galaxy 1957/11)
 "The Leech" (Galaxy 1952/12)
 "Watchbird" (Galaxy 1953/2)
 "A Wind Is Rising" (Galaxy 1957/7)
 "Morning After" (Galaxy 1957/11)
 "The Native Problem" (Galaxy 1956/12)
 "Feeding Time" (Fantasy Fiction 1953/2)
 "Paradise II" (Time to Come, collection edited by August Derleth, 1954)
 "Double Indemnity" (Galaxy 1957/10)
 "Holdout" (F&SF 1957/12)
 "Dawn Invader" (F&SF 1957/3)
 "The Language of Love" (Galaxy 1957/5)

External links

1960 short story collections
Short story collections by Robert Sheckley
Bantam Books books
American short story collections